Suai Airport , officially Commander in Chief of FALINTIL, Kay Rala Xanana Gusmão, International Airport, and also known as Covalima Airport, is an airport serving Suai, in Cova Lima Municipality, East Timor.

Location
The airport's runway (16/34) is oriented broadly north-south.

History
As of 1974 and 1975, Transportes Aéreos de Timor (TAT), the national airline of the then Portuguese Timor, was operating scheduled domestic services from Dili to Covalima/Suai.

In April 1983, an Indonesian State-owned airline, Merpati Nusantara Airlines, started operating a Kupang–Dili––Covalima/Suai flight. In 1985, that service was being flown twice a week. As of the mid 1990s, Merpati was still flying into Covalima/Suai, and in mid 1999, Merpati was operating one flight a week on a Dili–Covalima/Suai–Kupang routing, using an Indonesian-built CASA turboprop aircraft.

When the Indonesian occupation of East Timor came to an end later that year, the runway at Suai was still only very short. During the ensuing INTERFET peacemaking operation, the 17th Construction Squadron of the Australian Army upgraded the airport to support all-weather operations by Lockheed C-130 Hercules aircraft. Hard stands were provided, along with accommodation, workshops and five helipads.

At around that time, the terminal was remodelled and fitted with air conditioning.

In general, the airport was for day time use only, but helicopter operations could be supported at night.

East Timor's national Strategic Development Plan 2011-2030 identified a need to extend and refurbish the runway and build new modern facilities. After a significant upgrading, the airport in its present form was officially inaugurated on 20 June 2017, and named in honour of East Timorese resistance leader and statesman Xanana Gusmão.

On 28 September 2018, the airport hosted its first international arrival, a charter flight from Darwin, Australia, operated by Northern Oil & Gas Australia (NOGA).

, the airport was barely being used, and usually had no more than one flight a day.

Facilities
As upgraded, the airport has modern facilities complying with the International Civil Aviation Organization (ICAO) standards for the safe operation of airplanes, light aircraft and helicopters.  The facilities include a  runway, a terminal building, a control tower, a fire station, a meteorological station and a helipad with medevac air ambulance facilities.

See also
 List of airports in East Timor
 Transport in East Timor

References

Further reading

External links

 
 Foto: Keren, BUMN RI Ini Sulap Bandara di Timor Leste Jadi Megah – article  with photographs of the airport

Airports in East Timor
Cova Lima Municipality